The 2016 Belgian Grand Prix (formally known as the 2016 Formula 1 Belgian Grand Prix) was a Formula One motor race held on 28 August 2016 at the Circuit de Spa-Francorchamps in Spa, Belgium. It was the thirteenth round of the 2016 FIA Formula One World Championship, and marks the seventy-second running of the Belgian Grand Prix and the fifty-ninth time the race was held at Spa-Francorchamps.

Mercedes driver and defending race winner Lewis Hamilton entered the race leading the World Drivers' Championship by nineteen points ahead of teammate Nico Rosberg. In the World Constructors' Championship, Mercedes held a lead of 159 points. Red Bull Racing was lying second, having passed Ferrari in the standings at the previous round in Germany.

Nico Rosberg won this Grand Prix, with Daniel Ricciardo and Lewis Hamilton, second and third respectively. Hamilton received a multi-grid penalty before the start of the race. Hamilton retained the championship lead, with Rosberg closing the gap to nine points. Red Bull's Max Verstappen and both Ferraris were involved in an incident at the start of the race.

The race was stopped on lap 9 after Kevin Magnussen crashed heavily at Raidillon, suffering a 12.5G impact, causing structural damage to the armoured collision barrier and tyre wall which required repairs, before the race could resume under green flag conditions. Magnussen suffered a cut on his ankle but no serious injury.

Background

Driver changes
Esteban Ocon made his Formula One début, replacing Rio Haryanto at MRT. Haryanto stayed with the team, filling a testing and reserve role.

Tyres
Tyre supplier Pirelli provided teams with the super-soft, soft and medium compounds for the races. Drivers were also supplied with two sets of "prototype" soft tyres for use in the Friday practice sessions, which were designed to provide similar lap times and performance to the existing soft compound whilst being more durable when striking kerbs and going beyond track limits. The prototype tyres were introduced to allow Pirelli to gain data on their performance ahead of their competitive début in Malaysia, where they will replace the existing soft compound.

Upgrades
Both Honda and Mercedes introduced upgrades to their power units for the race, while Sauber brought their first updates of the season for the C35 chassis.

Penalties
Lewis Hamilton, Marcus Ericsson and Fernando Alonso took grid penalties for exceeding their season allocation of engine components; Hamilton received fifteen places for using his sixth turbocharger and associated Motor Generator Unit, while Ericsson was demoted ten places for replacing his turbocharger, and Alonso thirty-five places for introducing his sixth complete power unit. Hamilton received a second set of penalties when Mercedes introduced a seventh turbocharger and MGU-H ahead of the second free practice session; and a third set for further changes ahead of the final practice session, thereby guaranteeing that he would start the race from last place. Mercedes deliberately took the penalties as they sought to stockpile new components for the remainder of the season, deeming the Circuit de Spa-Francorchamps to be a venue where the potential for overtaking offset the penalties.

Esteban Gutiérrez received a five-place grid penalty for dangerous driving during the final practice session when Pascal Wehrlein was forced to take evasive action and cross the grassy verge on the inside of Raidillon to avoid contact.

On race day, Mercedes removed a seal on the gearbox of Hamilton's car so he could take a new gearbox at the next race, giving the world champion an additional five place grid penalty. The penalty was initially incorrectly issued and originally designated Hamilton to start from the pit lane.

Qualifying

Notes:
 – Esteban Gutiérrez received a five-place grid penalty for impeding Pascal Wehrlein during the final practice session on Saturday.
 – Marcus Ericsson was penalised 10 grid places for unscheduled power unit element changes.
 – Lewis Hamilton received a 60-place grid penalty after Mercedes opted to replace several elements on his power unit, then remove a seal from his gearbox.
 – Fernando Alonso received a 60-place grid penalty after McLaren opted to replace several elements on his power unit. As Alonso also failed to set a qualifying time, his participation in the race came at the stewards' discretion.

Race

Race report 
At the start Nico Rosberg got away well, Max Verstappen got a poor start and was passed by both Ferraris of Sebastian Vettel and Kimi Räikkönen, going into La Source Verstappen tried to come back at both Ferraris only to hit Räikkönen who in turn then hit his teammate Vettel spinning him round, all three had to come back to the pits for repairs. At Les Combes Jenson Button was hit by Manor's Pascal Wehrlein taking them both out of the race. Carlos Sainz suffered a tyre failure and pulled off the track causing a virtual safety car, at this point Fernando Alonso had made it up to 12th with all the chaos and Lewis Hamilton was up to 15th. The race restarted but soon after Kevin Magnussen suffered a crash when his car spun and smashed into the tyre wall at Raidillon, Magnussen limped out of the car but did require medical attention for an injured ankle, the race was initially neutralised under the safety car before being stopped two laps later so they could repair the tyre barrier. At the restart Hamilton was able to pass Alonso but then it took him several laps to get past the Force India of Nico Hülkenberg. Rosberg won the race followed by Daniel Ricciardo with Hamilton finishing third.

Post race 
Kevin Magnussen had been taken to hospital as a precaution but tweeted that he was fine and he would be racing at the next Grand Prix in Italy.

Race classification

Championship standings after the race

Drivers' Championship standings

Constructors' Championship standings

 Note: Only the top five positions are included for both sets of standings.

See also 
 2016 Spa-Francorchamps GP2 Series round
 2016 Spa-Francorchamps GP3 Series round

References

External links

2016 Formula One races
Grand Prix
2016
August 2016 sports events in Europe